Leipzig FC may refer to several football clubs in Leipzig, Germany:

Current
 RB Leipzig, founded 2009, as at 2023 in the Bundesliga (top tier of German football)
 1. FC Lokomotive Leipzig, founded 1893, as at 2023 in the Regionalliga Nordost (fourth tier of German football)
 BSG Chemie Leipzig (1997), founded 1997, as at 2023 in the Regionalliga Nordost (fourth tier of German football)

Defunct
 TuRa Leipzig, 1899–1945
 BSG Chemie Leipzig (1950), 1950–1990
 FC Sachsen Leipzig, 1990–2011